Victor Valley Transit Authority (VVTA), the second largest transit operator in San Bernardino County (with over 1,020,119 passengers a year), is a transit agency providing bus service in the Victor Valley, California area.

In June 2015, VVTA was designated as a Consolidated Transportation Services Agency (CTSA) for the High & North Desert regions of San Bernardino County. This represented an expanding role and commitment to the Authority's already established Mobility Management department and increased the VVTA service area from 425 to 950 square miles.

Origins of the VVTA 
VVTA operates local fixed-route, county commuter (discontinued in 2005), and ADA complementary paratransit bus
services in the Victor Valley area. It has a maintenance facility located in Hesperia. The service
structure consists of 23 local fixed and deviated routes, 3 County routes and ADA complementary paratransit service.
VVTA was established through a Joint Powers Authority in 1991. The JPA includes the four
cities of Adelanto, Apple Valley, Hesperia and Victorville and certain unincorporated
portions of the County of San Bernardino including Oro Grande, Helendale, Lucerne Valley, Phelan, Piñon Hills, Wrightwood. Service is also provided to  Barstow and Fort Irwin. The Fort Irwin service is branded as the NTC Commuter. The Board of Directors includes council members from the above cities and the San Bernardino 1st
District Supervisor. Since 1998, the Board has held a management contract with McDonald Transit Associates, Inc.
for administration of the system. In January 2005, the operations contract for all
transit service in the Victor Valley area was consolidated under a separate contract with ATC
(later Veoila, now Transdev). In 2018, National Express Transit became the system operator.

Barstow Area Transit 

Barstow Area Transit formerly ran the transportation service in Barstow and surrounding areas of San Bernardino County, including the communities of Hinkley, Lenwood, Grandview, Yermo, Harvard, Daggett and Newberry Springs. It was merged into VVTA in 2015.

MV Transportation, Inc. was contracted by the city to operate Barstow Area Transit. Barstow Area Transit operated Monday through Friday from 6:00 a.m. to 11:30 p.m. and on the weekends from 9:00 a.m. to 11:30 p.m; the system carried more than 144,000 passengers each year.

The system featured three routes: Central Barstow, which was called Route 1 while running as a clockwise loop and Route 2 while running counterclockwise; West Barstow/Grandview/Lenwood, which was called Route 3 while running clockwise and Route 4 while running counterclockwise; and Hwy 58 which traveled crosstown as Route 5.

Routes 
VVTA routes include Fixed, County, Intercity, and Commuter. County routes and some Fixed Routes can deviate as far as 3/4 mile to pick up passengers. County routes serve outlying rural areas. In August 2021, all routes at Lorene and 7th were moved to the Victor Valley Transportation Center (VVTC). On Sunday, October 2, 2022 VVTA returned to full-service.

Routes 1-9 are Barstow routes; 10-19 are Intercity routes; 20-29 are County routes; 30-39 are Routes primarily in Adelanto; 40-49 are Apple Valley, 50-59 are Victorville, 60-69 are Hesperia, and 100 series are the NTC Commuter. All routes operate 7 days a week except 50X (Monday-Thursday) and 111-118 (Weekdays only).

Routes 

 1 - Barstow City Hall-Walmart
 2 - Barstwow City Hall-Barstow College
 3 - Barstow City Hall-Lenwood
 15 - Barstow-VVTC-San Bernardino
 21P - Hesperia Super Target-Pinon Hills via Phelan
 21W - Hesperia Super Target-Wrightwood via Phelan
 22 - Helendale-VVTC
 23 - Apple Valley-Lucerne Valley
 25 - Hesperia Post Office-Hesperia Super Target via Ranchero Rd
 28 - Barstow City Hall-Helendale
 29 - Barstow City Hall-Newberry Springs
 31 - VVTC-Highway 395 & Palmdale via South Adelanto
 32 - VVTC-North Adelanto
 33 - Highway 395 & Palmdale-Bartlett & Greening (Deviation)
 40 - Apple Valley Post Office-Walmart (Deviation)
 41 - Apple Valley Post Office-VVTC
 42 - Victor Valley College-Publioc Safety Training Center
 43 - Apple Valley Post Office-Victor Valley College
 47 - Apple Valley Post Office-Bear Valley & Kiowa (Deviation)
 50 - VVTC-Hesperia Post Office
 50X - VVTC-Victor Valley College Express
 52 - VVTC-Victor Valley Mall
 53 - Victor Valley College-Victor Valley Mall
 54 - Highway 395 & Palmdale-Victor Valley Mall (Deviation)
 55 - VVTC-Victor Valley College
 56 - VVTC-Lorene & 7th
 64 - Hesperia Post Office-Super Target
 66 - Hesperia East Deviation
 68 - Hesperia Post Office-Super Target via Main St
 111 - Barstow-Fort Irwin
 114 - Hesperia/Victorville-Fort Irwin
 115 - Helendale-Fort Irwin
 118 - Fort Irwin-Victorville/Hesperia

Micro-Link 
On Monday, October 3, 2022, Micro-Link was introduced in three zones - Zone 1 South Victorville; Zone 2 North Victorville, and Zone 3 Hesperia.

Fleet 

155-209, 1003-1009. 8188-8195 are used on Direct Access. 1011-1013 are used on the new Micro-Link service.

Governance 
Victor Valley Transit Authority is administered by a Board of Directors, consisting of five Members (each with an alternate). The four board members from the cities are elected council persons assigned to VVTA by their respective city councils. The fifth Board member is the San Bernardino 1st District Supervisor (generally a staff person or the supervisor represents the county as the alternate). The Board is required under the JPA Memorandum of Understanding (MOU) to meet at least one time each quarter of each fiscal year. Board meetings are generally monthly in Hesperia, with every third meeting in Barstow. All meetings are held in compliance with the Ralph M. Brown Act. Board meetings are presided by the Board-appointed Chair. The board of directors is responsible for such acts as adopting the budget, approving route and schedule changes, public hearings as required, appointing the CEO/General Manager, appointing a technical advisory committee, establishing policy, and adopting rules and regulations for the conduct of business. The VVTA Technical Advisory (TAC) committee is the working group for the VVTA Board. It is composed of a staff member from each of the cities and County who is generally appointed by the City Manager, County Supervisor. The TAC takes direction from the Board to make recommendations on policy issues. In addition, TAC reviews monthly all suggested Board agenda items and decides on what actions to recommend to the Board for approval.

References

External links 
 
 Barstow Area Transport official website
 Sanbag info on public transit in san bernardino county
SBCTA info on public transit in san bernardino county

Public transportation in San Bernardino County, California
Victor Valley
Transit agencies in California
Bus transportation in California
Transit authorities with natural gas buses
Mojave Desert
Barstow, California
Hesperia, California
Victorville, California
Wrightwood, California
Transportation in San Bernardino, California